Atchison Township is the name of two townships in the U.S. state of Missouri:

 Atchison Township, Clinton County, Missouri
 Atchison Township, Nodaway County, Missouri

Missouri township disambiguation pages